Martin Davídek (born August 7, 1986) is a Czech professional ice hockey left winger playing for EHC Bayreuth of DEL2.

Davídek previously played 47 games in the Czech Extraliga for Vsetínská hokejová, HC Znojemští Orli and HC Kometa Brno. He also played two seasons in the Deutsche Eishockey Liga for ERC Ingolstadt, from 2014 to 2016.

References

External links

1986 births
Living people
EHC Bayreuth players
Czech ice hockey left wingers
Dresdner Eislöwen players
ERC Ingolstadt players
KLH Vajgar Jindřichův Hradec players
Sportovní Klub Kadaň players
HC Kometa Brno players
EV Landshut players
HC Olomouc players
Orli Znojmo players
Piráti Chomutov players
Sportspeople from Opava
VHK Vsetín players
Czech expatriate ice hockey players in Germany
Naturalized citizens of Germany